Keenan Craig Horne (born 17 June 1992) is a South African field hockey player. He competed in the 2020 Summer Olympics.

Personal life
He at graduated cum laude with a Master’s degree in law from Stellenbosch University.

References

External links

1992 births
Living people
Field hockey players from Cape Town
Field hockey players at the 2018 Commonwealth Games
Field hockey players at the 2020 Summer Olympics
South African male field hockey players
Olympic field hockey players of South Africa
Male field hockey forwards
Stellenbosch University alumni
20th-century South African people
21st-century South African people
Field hockey players at the 2022 Commonwealth Games
2023 Men's FIH Hockey World Cup players